Okhrey is a small village situated in West Sikkim district, India. Okhrey is mostly inhabited by Sherpas. The main occupation of the people of Okhrey is farming, and they mainly produce potatoes.

Villages in Gyalshing district